Vision of the Seas is a Vision-class cruise ship operated by Royal Caribbean International, the last of her class.  Her maiden voyage was on May 2, 1998, following which she sailed for a year in Europe before being moved to other routes.

In 2013, Vision of the Seas received a dry dock refit.

Design
The cruise ship has a deadweight tonnage of 6,300 tons and a gross tonnage of 78,491. Vision of the Seas was launched in 1997. The cruise ship has 10 passenger decks and capacity for 2,416 guests. Vision of the Seas has a crew of 765.

See also 
 List of cruise ships

References

External links

Official website

Ships of Royal Caribbean International
Ships built in France
1997 ships